It Was a Short Summer, Charlie Brown is the sixth prime-time animated television special based on the popular comic strip Peanuts, created by Charles M. Schulz. It was directed by Bill Melendez and originally aired on CBS on September 27, 1969.

It Was a Short Summer, Charlie Brown was the first Peanuts special not to receive any Emmy Award nominations.

Plot
School is out for the summer and Charlie, Linus, Schroeder, and Pig Pen are planning to spend it reading every comic book, watching television, playing baseball, and playing classical music. However, Lucy tells them that she signed them up for camp. The girls are eager to go, but the boys hate the idea. The boys shove each other to get on the bus, while the girls line up in order. At camp, Charlie is chosen as captain of the boys' camp. The boys and girls have a swim race, which the girls win easily. Then they have a softball game, which the boys lose with only one run. Other competitions are just as lopsided.

Charlie and Shermy, disillusioned by their continued defeat, see Snoopy arm-wrestling with the boys. They realize that the boys might get even with an arm wrestling game, with "The Masked Marvel" (Snoopy) as their champion. Snoopy goes into training, eating the camp's awful food, doing exercises, and drinking a nutritious and noxious concoction. In the contest, Snoopy goes up against Lucy. They both get sweaty and tired in the match, which ends when Snoopy kisses Lucy. He pins her hand; but she says that kissing her was a foul, and she is the winner.

Back at school, Charlie only comes up with 13 words on his essay that he and Linus are forced to write on the first day, having been caught playing hangman in class. Linus gets an A but Charlie gets a C−. Linus then says "Oh, well, it was a short summer, Charlie Brown", to which Charlie gloomily replies, "And it looks like it's going to be a long winter".

Cast
 Peter Robbins as Charlie Brown
 Pamelyn Ferdin as Lucy van Pelt
 Glenn Gilger as Linus van Pelt
 Hilary Momberger as Sally Brown
 Ann Altieri as Frieda and Violet Gray
 David Carey as Shermy
 Christopher DeFaria as Peppermint Patty
 Chris DeFaria as Pig-Pen
 Sally Dryer as Sophie, Clara and Shirley
 Matthew Liftin as Roy
 Lisa DeFaria as Patty
 John Daschback as Schroeder
 Bill Melendez as Snoopy

Credits
 Created and Written by: Charles M. Schulz
 Directed by: Bill Melendez
 Produced by: Lee Mendelson, Bill Melendez
 Graphic Blandishment: Ed Levitt, Bernard Gruver, Ellie Bonnard, Evert Brown, Don Lusk, Frank Smith, Bob Carlson, Spencer Peel, Ruth Kissane, Beverly Robbins, Rudy Zamora, Brad Case, Phil Roman, Bill Littlejohn, Herman Cohen, Manuel Perez, Hank Smith, Jan Strejan, Sam Jaimes, Eleanor Warren, Faith Kovaleski, Manon Washburn, Gwenn Dotzler
 Original Score Composed and Performed by: Vince Guaraldi
 Arranged and Conducted by: John Scott Trotter
 Assistant Director: Hideyuki Tanaka
 Editing: Bob Gillis, Chuck McCann, Steve Melendez
 Recording:
 Voices: Radio Recorders, Sid Nicholas
 Music: United Recorders, Arte Becker
 Mix: Producers' Sound Service, Don Minkler, Bill Mumford
 Camera: Jim Dixon, Nick Vasu, Wally Bulloch
 In Cooperation with United Feature Syndicate, Inc.
 THE END "It Was a Short Summer, Charlie Brown" © 1969 United Feature, Inc.

Production notes
It Was a Short Summer, Charlie Brown was the first Peanuts special to not feature the majority of the original voice cast from the inaugural A Charlie Brown Christmas (1965), who had begun to age out of their roles; Ann Altieri, Sally Dryer and Peter Robbins (in his last appearance voicing Charlie Brown) did return, as did Melendez, who once again not only directed but voiced Snoopy and Woodstock. Among the notable additions to the cast was Pamelyn Ferdin, Robbins's co-star on Blondie.

Music score
The score was recorded by the Vince Guaraldi Octet on September 11, 1969, at United Western Recorders, featuring Herb Ellis (guitar), Monty Budwig (bass), Conte Candoli (trumpet), Pete Candoli (trumpet), Frank Rosolino (trombone), Victor Feldman (percussion) and Jack Sperling (drums).

"Charlie Brown Theme" (version 1, horn section) (Vince Guaraldi, Lee Mendelson)
"Linus and Lucy" (flute and trio version)
"" (opening theme version)
"Oh, Good Grief" (version 1) (Vince Guaraldi, Lee Mendelson)
"You're in Love, Charlie Brown"
"Schroeder"
"Bus Blues" (John Scott Trotter)
"Bus Blues" (reprise) (John Scott Trotter)
"" (version 2)
"Frieda (With the Naturally Curly Hair)" (big band version)
"Oh, Good Grief" (version 2) (Vince Guaraldi, Lee Mendelson)
"Come and Get It" (John Scott Trotter)
"Mess Call" (aka "Hash") (John Scott Trotter)
"Bon Voyage"
"Peppermint Patty"
"Nova Bossa" (John Scott Trotter)/"Love Will Come"/"Nova Bossa" (John Scott Trotter)
"Pack Up Your Troubles in Your Old Kit-Bag" (Felix Powell, George Asaf)
"There's a Long Long Trail A-Winding" (Alonzo Elliot, Stoddard King)
"Reveille" (Traditional, arr. John Scott Trotter)
"He's Your Dog, Charlie Brown"
"Pebble Beach"
"You're in Love, Charlie Brown"
"He's Your Dog, Charlie Brown" (reprise)
"The Masked Marvel" (long version)
"Air Music" (aka "Surfin' Snoopy")
"The Masked Marvel" (shorter version)
"You're in Love, Charlie Brown" (reprise)
"The Masked Marvel" (shortest version)
"Linus and Lucy" (arm wrestling version)
"Oh, Good Grief" (version 3) (Vince Guaraldi, Lee Mendelson)
"Charlie Brown Theme" (version 2) (Vince Guaraldi, Lee Mendelson)
"" (end credits version)

Home media
In 1985, Media Home Entertainment released the special on VHS and Betamax along with It's the Great Pumpkin, Charlie Brown and What a Nightmare, Charlie Brown. It was re-released by its kids subdivision Hi-Tops Video in 1989. Paramount Home Media Distribution released the special along with You're Not Elected, Charlie Brown as part of the Snoopy Double Feature: Volume 3 compilation on August 17, 1994. On July 7, 2009, it was released on DVD for the first time, in remastered form as part of the DVD box set, Peanuts 1960s Collection. On October 6, 2015, the special was released in the remastered deluxe edition of He's a Bully, Charlie Brown along with an episode from The Charlie Brown and Snoopy Show as bonus specials.

References

External links

CBS television specials
Peanuts television specials
Television shows directed by Bill Melendez
1960s American television specials
1960s animated television specials
1969 television specials
1969 in American television
Summer camps in television